This is a list of electoral results for the electoral district of Rockhampton in Queensland state elections.

Members for Rockhampton

  Milford did not take his seat, resigned, and was defeated in the resulting by-election.

Election results

Elections in the 2020s

Elections in the 2010s

Elections in the 2000s

Elections in the 1990s

Elections in the 1980s

Elections in the 1970s

Elections in the 1950s

Elections in the 1940s

Elections in the 1930s 

 Preferences were not distributed.

 Preferences were not distributed.

Elections in the 1920s

Elections in the 1910s

Elections in the 1860s

Queensland general election, held on 27 June 1867
The result in Rockhampton in the general election held on 27 June 1867 were:

References

Queensland state electoral results by district